Pierre Edmond Piasecki (born 3 June 1985) is a French sports shooter. He placed sixth in the 10 metre air rifle event at the 2012 Summer Olympics. He works as a customs officer.

References

External links
 

1985 births
Living people
French male sport shooters
Olympic shooters of France
Shooters at the 2012 Summer Olympics
Sportspeople from Metz
European Games competitors for France
Shooters at the 2015 European Games
Shooters at the 2019 European Games
21st-century French people